Raymond Lesley Homoet (born 13 November 1978 in Hoorn, Netherlands) is a Netherlands Antilles footballer. He plays as a goalkeeper for amateur side Zwaluwen '30.

References

External links
 Profile at VI

1980 births
Living people
Dutch footballers
Dutch people of Curaçao descent
Dutch Antillean footballers
Netherlands Antilles international footballers
FC Volendam players
Association football goalkeepers
People from Hoorn
Curaçao footballers
Footballers from North Holland